The Konks was an American rock and roll band, based in Boston, Massachusetts. They released their self-titled debut album in March 2005, with Bomp! Records. The band was later signed to Static Eye Records and released their second album Nerves in early 2010.  The band played their final show at Great Scott in Allston, Massachusetts in early 2011.

Studio albums
The Konks (2005)
Nerves

In other media
The Konks' song "29 Fingers", from their debut album, is featured in the video game Rock Band, and vocalist Kurt (an employee of Rock Band developer Harmonix Music Systems) is featured in the tutorial mode of the game.

Band members
 Kurt Davis (vocals/drums) - Kurt was formerly the lead singer for Bullet LaVolta and a drummer for Kustomized.
 Bob Wilson (guitar)
 Jon Porth (bass)

External links
The Konks at Last FM
The Konks' Official Website

Indie rock musical groups from Massachusetts
Musical groups from Boston